This page lists nationwide public opinion polls that have been conducted relating to the 2018 Czech presidential election.

Poll results are listed in the tables below in reverse chronological order, showing the most recent first. The highest percentage figure in each polling survey is displayed in bold, and the background shaded in the leading candidate's colour. In the instance that there is a tie, then no figure is shaded. Poll results use the date the survey's fieldwork was done, as opposed to the date of publication. However, if such date is unknown, the date of publication will be given instead.

Opinion polls for the first round

Since nominations were closed

Polls conducted in 2017
April - 7 November

January - April

Polls conducted in 2016

Polls conducted in 2015

Polls conducted in 2014

Opinion polls for the second round

Zeman vs Drahoš

Hypothetical polling 
The polls listed below include candidates who decided not to run, failed to secure nomination, or did not advance past the first round of the election.

Zeman vs Horáček

Zeman vs Topolánek

Zeman vs Fischer

Zeman vs Hilšer

Zeman vs Kulhánek

Zeman vs Hynek

Zeman vs Hannig

Drahoš vs Horáček

Drahoš vs Topolánek

Drahoš vs Fischer

Zeman vs Kubera

Zeman vs Švejnar

Zeman vs Pospíšil

Zeman vs Stropnický

Zeman vs Okamura

Zeman vs Wagnerová

Zeman vs Dlouhý

Zeman vs Jourová

Zeman vs Halík

Zeman vs Kolář

Drahoš vs Stropnický

Horáček vs Stropnický

Probability of being elected
Two agencies published trackers where they continually inferred the probability of election of the candidates.

Election potential

Acceptability of candidates

Since nominations were closed

Polls conducted before

Media Surveys

Since nominations were closed

Before nominations were closed

Other opinion polls

Multiple question

Other voting

References

Opinion polling for presidential elections in the Czech Republic
2018 Czech presidential election